Parliamentary elections were held in Laos on 18 August 1951 to elect members of the National Assembly, the lower chamber of Parliament. Unlike previous elections, which had been held on a non-partisan basis, this one saw political parties compete for the first time. The result was a victory for the National Progressive Party, which won 19 of the 39 seats.

Results

References

Laos
Elections in Laos
1951 in Laos
Election and referendum articles with incomplete results